The International Hologram Manufacturers Association (IHMA) is a not for profit organisation based in Sunbury-on-Thames designed to represent and promote the interests of hologram manufacturers and the hologram industry, worldwide.  Founded in 1993, the association currently represents 89 members worldwide, and hosts an awards ceremony each year at the HoloPackHoloPrint conference designed to reward those whose outstanding contributions to holography advance the industry. The association has secretariat offices in both Europe and America.

Aims & Benefits
The Association's aims are:

 To promote the worldwide interests of the holography industry
 To promote, through a Code of Conduct ethical business practice and high standards amongst its membership
 To shape the direction and development of the industry
 To encourage communication within the holography industry
 To reward outstanding holographic developments

In addition to contributing to the aims of the association, IHMA membership allows members certain benefits. These include:
 
 Intergraf's security certification for secure hologram producers
 Inclusion in the Hologram Image Register - an IHMA initiative that protects holographic images
 Subscription to Holography News
 Publicity and holography patent alerts

Publications
The IHMA have published a number of publications offering guidance to converters, users and manufacturers of holograms and other holographic materials. These are
 
 The Glossary of Holographic Terms
 Specifying and Purchasing Authenticating DOVIDS
 Hologram Patent Guidelines
 Hologram Copyright Guidelines

Excellence in Holography Awards
Each year, at the Holopack-Holoprint annual conference, the IHMA presents 'Excellence in Holography Awards' to parties deemed to have made outstanding contributions to the holographic industry.  The awards, divided into six categories aim to reward the developments which show the greatest innovation or commercial potential.

The six categories available to vote on are:

 Innovation in Holographic Technique
 Best Origination
 Best HOE Product
 Best Applied Security Product
 Best Applied Decorative Product
 The Brian Monaghan Award for Business Innovation

From these and the other categories one winner is chosen for the Best of the Year Award. 
A further award, the Brian Monaghan Award for Business Innovation, is made at the discretion of the IHMA to an individual judged to have made an outstanding contribution to the development of the hologram industry. Past winners of this award include Sal D’Amato of ABNH, Werner Reinhart of Kurz, Gunther Dausmann of Hologram Industries Research, hologram inventor Steve McGrew, Hugues Souparis of Hologram Industries, U.K. Gupta of Holostik, Dino Radice of Centro Grafico, Professor Alexander Goncharsky of Computer Holography Centre, Ian Lancaster of Reconnaissance International, Philip Hudson, Dimes Pastorelli of Diavy Srl and Brian Monaghan himself posthumously.

Current members
The IHMA currently have nearly 102 members worldwide. They are:

 Holostik
 AHEAD Optoelectronics, Inc.
 Maede Design Hologram Printing in Iran
 Alpha Lasertek India Ltd
 Andrews & Wykeham
 API Holographics
 Atech-Holografica
 Azure Photonics Co Ltd
 Bajaj Holographics (I) Pvt Ltd
 BEP Hologram
 Boad Negar Iranian Company Ltd
 sinapacking Company- In IRAN
 Centro Grafico DG SpA
 Coformex SA de CV
 Computer Holography Centre
 Combustion Ingenieros S.A.S.
 Constantia Hueck Folien GmbH
 Crown Roll Leaf, Inc.
 Dai Nippon Printing Co., Ltd.
 De La Rue Holographics
 Demax holograms PLC https://demax-holograms.com
 DiArts srl
 Diavy srl
 Everest Holovisions Ltd
 Essentra Security
 Fasver
 Fedrigoni SpA
 Filak s.r.o.
 First Print Yard Holographics
 Formas Inteligentes SA de CV
 Giriraj Foils Pvt Ltd
 Gopsons Papers Ltd
 Hague Print Limited
 Hazen Paper Company
 Henan Province Wellking Technologies
 Hi-Glo Images Pvt Ltd
 HOLO 3D s.r.l.
 Hologram Solutions SDn BHD
 Holographic Security Concepts
 Holo Security Technologies
 Holoflex Limited
 Holografia Polska
 Hologram Company Rako
 Hologram.Industries
 Holographic Security Marking Systems Pvt. Ltd.
 HoloGrate,JSC
 HoMAI
 Holostik India Limited
 HuBei LHTC
 Hueck Folien GmbH
 Imprensa Nacional Casa da Moeda
 Impresora Silvaform
 Istituto Poligrafico e Zecca Stato
 IQ Structures s.r.o.
 ITW Covid
 J Patton Sports
 JSC Holography Industry Ltd
 Jupiter Enterprises
 Kantas Track Pack India Ltd
 K Laser Technology Inc.
 Kumbhat Holographics
 ITW Covid
 Laser Art Studio Ltd
 Leonardus SrL
 LEONHARD KURZ Stiftung & Co.KG
 LightGate a.s.
 MTM Holografi Güvenlikli Basim ve Bilisim Teknolojileri San ve Tic A.S
 New Light Industries
 Nikka Techno Inc
 NovaVision Inc
 OpSec Security Ltd
 Optaglio Group
 Pacific Holographics
 Papierfabrik Louisenthal GmbH
 Pardazesh Tasvir Rayan
 Polish Holographic Systems
 Process Color
 PT Jasuindo Tiga Perksa Tbk 
 Pura Group
 Rainbow Holographics Ltd
 Reflective Materials Manufactory (HoloArt)
 S.C. Optoelectronica 2001 S.A.
 Schreiner ProSecure
 Scientific & Technical Centre "Atlas"
 Shantou Yiming Holotech Machine Co
 Sheetal Mercantile Pvt Ltd
 Shriram Holographics
 SK Hologram Co Ltd
 Smartstripe marketing Pte Ltd
 
 Starcke Oy
 System Intelligence Products
 Taurus Secure Solutions
 Toppan Printing Company
 Trautwein Security GmbH & Co
 Uflex md (Holography Division)
 U-NICA
 Huagong Image Tech
 Zoomsoft

References

Notes

Bibliography

External links
 

Holography industry
Manufacturing trade associations
Organisations based in Surrey
Sunbury-on-Thames